Distylium myricoides is a species in the genus Distylium in the family Hamamelidaceae. It is native to southern China.

Description
Distylium myricoides is a woody evergreen perennial shrub or small tree. It flowers from April-June, and fruits from June-August.

Etymology
Distylium is derived from Greek and means 'two styles'. The name is in reference to the plant's prominent, separate styles.

Myricoides means 'resembling Myrica'.

References

Hamamelidaceae
Endemic flora of China